The Cellesche Zeitung is a medium-size local newspaper with a circulation of 32,200. It is distributed in the town and district of Celle in North Germany by Schweiger & Pick Verlag. Apart from the periphery of its area with Hanover Region, where it also competes with the Hannoversche Allgemeine Zeitung, the Cellesche Zeitung has a monopoly over local reporting.

Despite its moderate scale, the newspaper has its own full editorial team which produces not only local news, but also pan-regional features on politics, the economy and sport.

References

Sources
 Ulrich Pätzold/Horst Röper: Medienatlas Niedersachsen-Bremen 2000. Medienkonzentration – Meinungsmacht – Interessenverflechtung. Verlag Buchdruckwerkstätten Hannover GmbH, Hannover 2000, 
 Jörg Aufermann/Victor Lis/Volkhard Schuster: Zeitungen in Niedersachsen und Bremen. Handbuch 2000. Verband Nordwestdeutscher Zeitungsverleger/Zeitungsverlegerverband Bremen, Hannover/Bremen 2000,

External links

 Newspaper website 
 History of the paper 

Newspapers published in Germany
German-language newspapers
Mass media in Celle